Spartz is a surname. Notable people with the surname include:

 Emerson Spartz (born 1987), American businessman
 Gaby Spartz (born 1987), Ecuadorian Twitch streamer and YouTube gamer
 Léon Spartz (1927–1997), Luxembourgian footballer
 Victoria Spartz (born 1978), American politician